The  is a Japanese national university in Toyama Prefecture established in 1949. The University of Toyama has three campuses, namely the Gofuku, Sugitani, and Takaoka campuses.

The University of Toyama, Sugitani campus is the home to Institute of Natural Medicine, Experimental Station for Medicinal Plant Research, Faculty of Medicine, Life Science Research,  Faculty of Pharmacy and Pharmaceutical Sciences, and Museum of Materia Medica and Pharmaceutical Science.

Numerous significant research on cell signaling as well as cancer research has transpired in the Division of Pathogenic Biochemistry under the Institute of Natural of Medicine, particularly, the works of Ikuo Saiki and Yoshihiro Hayakawa .

Overview

The University of Toyama is located in the cities of Toyama and Takaoka in Toyama Prefecture, Japan. It was formed in October 2005 by combining Toyama University, Toyama Medical and Pharmaceutical University, and Takaoka National College. The origin of Toyama University is Nikawa Teachers College founded in 1875. The University of Toyama has three campuses: Gofuku, Sugitani and Takaoka. It consists of eight faculties, six graduate schools, laboratories, a hospital, libraries, and 18 institutes. It has about 9,300 students (including 330 international students).

Faculties 
 Faculty of Humanities
 Faculty of Human Development
 Faculty of Economics
 Faculty of Science
 Faculty of Engineering
 Faculty of Medicine
 Faculty of Pharmacy and Pharmaceutical Sciences
 Liberal Arts and Sciences (Sugitani Campus)
 Faculty of Art and Design

Junior College of Business Administration
The  was a national junior college in the city of Toyama. The junior college opened in April 1959, affiliated with the University of Toyama. It offered evening courses in business management. The college closed in 1990.

Takaoka National College

 was a national junior college located in the city of Takaoka, Toyama, Japan. Takaoka National College was established in April 1983, with registration of students starting in 1986. It was merged with Toyama Medical and Pharmaceutical University and Toyama University to form the University of Toyama in 2005, and closed in 2010.

Note

References

External links

 
 History of Takaoka National College 

Educational institutions established in 1949
Japanese national universities
Universities and colleges in Toyama Prefecture
1949 establishments in Japan
Toyama (city)
American football in Japan